Kwolek is a Polish surname. Notable people with the surname include:

 Bartosz Kwolek (born 1997), Polish volleyball player
 Stephanie Kwolek (1923–2014), American chemist

Polish-language surnames